Marco Antonio Ghislina (1676–1756) was an Italian painter, active mainly in Casalmaggiore and Cremona, painting sacred subjects in a Baroque-style.

He was born in Casalmaggiore, Italy. From a young age was inclined to painting. He moved to Cremona at a young age, and was active for many years there. It is not known who was his master there. He painted in the church of the Santissima Annunciata (Chiesa dell'ex Ospedale) in Casalmaggiore. He was aided in his work by his wife and daughter.

References

External links

1676 births
1756 deaths
17th-century Italian painters
Italian male painters
18th-century Italian painters
Italian Baroque painters
Painters from Cremona
18th-century Italian male artists